WMIQ (1450 AM, "Talk 1450") is an American radio station licensed to serve the community of Iron Mountain, Michigan.  WMIQ is the Detroit Lions radio affiliate for Iron Mountain and the surrounding areas.

References
Michiguide.com - WMIQ History

External links

MIQ-AM
News and talk radio stations in the United States
Radio stations established in 2010